Pasha Kola-ye Enteqali (also Romanized as Pāshā Kolā-ye Enteqālī) is a village in Esfivard-e Shurab Rural District, in the Central District of Sari County, Mazandaran Province, Iran. At the 2006 census, its population was 933, in 238 families.

References 

Populated places in Sari County